The Government of India has declared  repugnant some battle honours earned by Indian Army units, which are descended from erstwhile units of the Presidency armies under the East India Company and later under the British Indian Army of the British Raj. Indian Army units do not inscribe these battle honours on their colours and do not celebrate commemoration days associated with these battles. This decision was taken post-independence regarding those battle honours concerned with battles in India and Pakistan which the Indian government regards as part of the "subjugation" of India and in some cases, neighbouring countries.

List of repugnant battle honours
Repugnant battle honours include :

 Assaye (1803)
 Carnatic
 Sholinghur
 Mangalore
 Mysore
 Sedaseer
 Seringapatam
 Egypt
 Delhi
 Leswarree
 Deig
 Kirkee
 Nagpore
 Maheidpoor
 Corygaum
 Nowah
 Ava
 Kemmendine
 Arracan
 Bhurtpore
 China
 Meeanee
 Hyderabad
 Maharajpoor
 Punniar
 Moodkee
 Ferozeshah
 Aliwal
 Sobraon
 Punjaub
 Chillianwallah
 Mooltan
 Goojerat
 Pegu
 Delhi 1857
 Lucknow
 Defence of Arrah
 Behar
 Central India
 Egypt 1882
 Burma 1885-87
 Defence of Chitral
 Punjab Frontier

Non-repugnant battle honours
The earliest battle honour held by the modern Indian Army which is not considered by the Indian Government to be "repugnant" and can be emblazoned on colours is "Bourbon" (dated 8 July 1810) which is held by the 3rd Battalion, Brigade of the Guards. Battle honours prior to this period have either been lost due to disbandment, are now held only by units transferred to Pakistan during Partition, or are considered by the Indian Government to be repugnant.

Other pre-World War I battle honours not considered by the Indian Government to be repugnant are as follows :
 Abyssinia 1868
 Afghanistan 1839
 Afghanistan 1878-80
 Ahmed Khel 1880
 Ali Masjid 1878
 Bani Bu Ali 1821
 Bourbon 1810
 Bushehr 1856
 Kabul 1842
 Kandahar 1842
 Charasiah 1879
 China 1858–59
 China 1860–62
 China 1900
 Cutchee
 Ghazni 1839
 Ghazni 1842
 Java 1811
 Kabul 1879
 Kahun 1840
 Kandahar 1880
 Khelat 1839
 Khushab 1856
 Malakand 1897
 Peiwar Kotal 1878
 Pekin 1860
 Pekin 1900
 Persia 1856-57
 Reshire 1856
 Samana 1897
 Somaliland 1901-04
 Dagu Forts 1900
 Tel-el-Kebir 1882
 Tirah 1897-98
 Tofrek 1885

Gallery

See also
 Battle and theatre honours of the Indian Army
 Awards and decorations of the Indian Armed Forces

Notes
Sandes, Lt Col E.W.C. The Indian Sappers and Miners (1948) The Institution of Royal Engineers, Chatham. Pages i to xxx, 1 to 726, frontispiece and 30 illustrations, 31 general maps and 51 plans.

References

Military history of British India
 
Battle honours of the Corps of Engineers
Indian military-related lists